Big Ear Tutu (Chinese: 大耳朵图图) is a Chinese cartoon television series. Its main character is Hu Tutu, a young boy with very large ears. The boy  (also known as Big Ear Tutu) is inquisitive and energetic. Often his curiosity drives the plot of the episode. His vivid imagination is especially part of his personality. He often learns from his mother and father, with whom he has a good relationship.

The series was nominated for the 23rd Golden Eagle Awards. It is popular among preschool age children in China.

The main character is also featured in books and comics.

Series

Award records 

 The 23rd China TV Golden Eagle Award for Best Choreographer and Director
 The 23rd China TV Golden Eagle Award for Outstanding Feature-length Art Film
 The "Series of Serials" at the 2008 China International Animation Festival Monkey Award for the United States
 2009 Publicity Department of the Chinese Communist Party the Best Works Award
 Best Animated Television Film, China Culture and Arts Government Award for Animation

Derivatives Development 

 In 2006, the derivatives of Big Ear Tutu had not yet established a complete industrial chain, and the related dolls, videos and books were still in the drafting stage and had not yet been implemented
 In 2008, another children's play, Big Ears Tutu Halloween Dream Adventure, was staged at the Shanghai Grand Theatre.
 In 2009, Big Ear Tutu was the first accessible animated film to be screened at the Shanghai School for Blind Children.

Introduction of Taiwan 
Taiwan TV station operators hope to introduce "Big Ear Tutu" in August 2008, subject to review by Government Information Office. During the 12th Shanghai International Film Festival, the mainland animation character "Big Ear Tutu" and the Taiwanese animation character YOYOMAN appeared together on the stage of the "Night of the Sea Film", which is the first cross-strait animation image cooperation and co-production of an animation series.

References

External links
First episode of Big Ear Tutu at YouTube

2004 Chinese television series debuts
Chinese children's animated television series
China Central Television original programming